André Soares (born 7 May 1956) is an Angolan Anglican bishop. He has been the first Anglican Bishop of Angola since 2003. He is married to Janete João and they have eight children, six sons and two daughters.

Ecclesiastical career
Soares was born in a village of Kinfinga, near Songo, and educated at the Pastoral Institute in Lukala, Zaire. He was ordained an Anglican priest in 1984 and began working in Uíge Province. In 1992 he became the Episcopal Delegate for Angola. In 2000 he was elected Vice-President of the Angolan Council of Churches. In 2003, he was nominated and consecrated the first bishop of the newly created missionary Diocese of Angola. In 2019, he became the first diocesan bishop when the missionary diocese became an independent diocese.

He is a supporter of women's ordination and he believes that it is not an obstacle to ecumenism.

References

External links
Bishop André Soares Personal Testemony (2005)

21st-century Anglican bishops in Africa
1956 births
Angolan Anglicans
Angolan clergy
Living people
People from Uíge Province
Anglican bishops of Angola